Nicky Smith (born 7 April 1994) is a Wales international rugby union player. A prop forward, he plays club rugby for the Ospreys regional team, having previously played for Aberavon RFC and Swansea RFC.

International

Smith is a Wales Under 20 international, having appeared for the team on 15 occasions. His first run-out for the U20's team was against Ireland U20's, during the 2013 Six Nations Under 20s Championship. He went on to play every match of the 2013 Championship, before being selected for the 2013 IRB Junior World Championship in France. Smith only played once during the U20's World Championship; Wales finished second overall behind England U20. Smith played in every match of the 2014 Six Nations Under 20s Championship, and every game of the 2014 IRB Junior World Championship in New Zealand - Wales finishing seventh.

In October 2014 he was named the Wales senior squad for the 2014 Autumn International series against Australia, Fiji, New Zealand and South Africa. Smith made his senior international debut for Wales on 15 November 2014 versus Fiji.

Smith is chosen to start in Wales' Six Nations opener against Italy in Rome on Sunday, 5 February 2017.

International tries

References

External links
 Ospreys profile
 Wales Under 20

Wales international rugby union players
Ospreys (rugby union) players
Swansea RFC players
Rugby union players from Swansea
1994 births
Living people
Rugby union props